"Pastures of Plenty" is a 1941 composition by Woody Guthrie. Describing the travails and dignity of migrant workers in North America, it is evocative of the world described in John Steinbeck's The Grapes of Wrath. The tune is based on the ballad "Pretty Polly", a traditional English-language folk song from the British Isles that was also well known in the Appalachian region of North America.

Recorded versions
 Harry Belafonte
 Bob Dylan
 Tom Paxton
 Jesse Colin Young
 Peter Tevis (The instrumental version of this song composed by Ennio Morricone was later used as the theme to A Fistful of Dollars)
 Peter, Paul and Mary
 Dave Van Ronk (on Just Dave Van Ronk)
 Ramblin' Jack Elliot
 Flatt and Scruggs
 Will Geer
 Kingston Trio
 Country Joe MacDonald
 Odetta
 The Alarm
 Solas
 Alison Krauss & Union Station
 Paul Kelly
 Lila Downs
 Cisco Houston
 Karl Denver
 Scott H. Biram
 The Travellers
 Holly Near and Ronnie Gilbert (duet)
 The Wayfarers
 Gareth Davies-Jones
 Frank Tovey
 Tim O'Brien
 John McCutcheon

Published versions
Rise Up Singing page 55

Popular culture
The phrase is used in a different context in the song "Talking Vietnam Pot-Luck Blues" by Tom Paxton.
The line "we come with the dust and we go with the wind" reappears as "that come with the dust and are gone with the wind" in Bob Dylan's "Song to Woody".

References

1941 songs
Woody Guthrie songs
Songs written by Woody Guthrie
Peter, Paul and Mary songs